Grand Lodge (foaled 6 March 1991, died 24 December 2003) was an American-bred, British-trained Thoroughbred racehorse. He was officially rated the best European two-year-old 1993. He won two Group One races; the Dewhurst Stakes in 1993 and the St James's Palace Stakes in 1994. He is best known as a successful sire. At the time of his death he was standing at the Woodlands Stud, Denman, New South Wales.

Background
Grand Lodge was bred by his owner John Scott-Ellis, 9th Baron Howard de Walden, who also owned and bred The Derby winner Slip Anchor and the champion miler Kris

He was sired by Chief's Crown out of Lord Howard de Walden's unraced mare La Papagena. 
Chief's Crown won the 1984 Breeders' Cup Juvenile and was voted the Eclipse Award for Outstanding Two-Year-Old Male Horse. He sired several other important horses including Chief Bearheart and Erhaab. La Papagena, a daughter of the Cheveley Park Stakes and Coronation Stakes winner Magic Flute, produced several other winners, the best of them probably being the Listed stakes winner La Persiana.

Grand Lodge was trained throughout his career by William "Willie" Jarvis at the Phantom House stables at Newmarket, Suffolk. When Grand Lodge ran, Jarvis often wore an apricot-coloured rose as a button-hole, to match the silks of Lord Howard de Walden.

Racing career

1993: two-year-old season
Grand Lodge won three of his four races as a two-year-old. On his debut he won the Granville Maiden Stakes at Ascot by six lengths. A month later at York he was beaten when odds-on favourite for the Listed Acomb Stakes, finishing third to Concordial.

At Newmarket in October he won the Somerville Tattersall Stakes, leading a furlong out and going clear to beat Colonel Collins by three and a half lengths, and was then moved up to Group One class for the Dewhurst Stakes over the same course and distance two weeks later. He was made 9/4 favourite and led inside the final furlong to beat Stonehatch and Nicolotte in a driving finish. Jarvis emphasised the care that he would take with his best horse by saying 'You ought to start buying shares in cotton wool because that's what this horse is going to be wrapped in."

1994: three-year-old season
Despite what his trainer had said, Grand Lodge was given a demanding schedule in 1994, running nine times, eight of them in Group One company.

His only win came at Royal Ascot where he ran on under a strong ride from Michael Kinane to beat Distant View by a head in the St James's Palace Stakes. After the race Jarvis called him "a very easy horse to train...Even I can't bugger him up." In other starts he was beaten a short head in both the 2000 Guineas and the Champion Stakes, finished third in the Sussex Stakes and Irish Champion Stakes and was fourth in the Irish 2,000 Guineas and the International Stakes.

On his last start he ran one of his few bad races, finishing unplaced behind Concern in the Breeders' Cup Classic on his only race on dirt.

Assessment
In the International Classification for 1993, he was rated the best two-year-old colt in Europe on a mark of 120. Despite this he was beaten in the voting for the Cartier Racing Award by the Middle Park Stakes winner First Trump.

At three, he was rated on 125, making him the seventh-best three-year-old in Europe, five pounds behind the filly Balanchine and three pounds below the leading colt, Distant View.

Stud career
Grand Lodge was retired to stand as a stallion for the Coolmore Stud, being shuttled between their main base in Ireland, Lord Howard de Walden's Plantation Stud in England and the Woodlands Stud in Australia. Grand Lodge proved to be an extremely popular stallion: between 1998 and 2003 he was covering an average of more than 300 mares a year. He sired the winners of more than six hundred races including Sinndar, Grandera, Queen's Logic, Grand Couturier (Sword Dancer Invitational Handicap), Indian Lodge and Shogun Lodge (Epsom Handicap).

Notable progeny

Throughout his career Grand Lodge sired 12 individual Group One winners for a total of 25 Group One races:

c = colt, f = filly, g = gelding

Death

On 4 September 2003, Grand Lodge suffered a knee injury in the paddock of the Woodlands Stud. The injury did not respond to treatment and he was euthanized on 24 December. He was buried at the Woodlands Stud. At the time of his death his stud fee for 2004 had already been set at €50,000.

Pedigree

References

1991 racehorse births
2003 racehorse deaths
Racehorses bred in Kentucky
Racehorses trained in the United Kingdom
Thoroughbred family 14-b